John Joseph Thomas Ryan (November 1, 1913 – October 9, 2000), better known as Joseph T. Ryan, was an American prelate of the Roman Catholic Church. He was archbishop of the Archdiocese for the Military Services, USA, from 1985 to 1991, having previously served as archbishop of the Archdiocese of Anchorage in Alaska from 1966 to 1975.

Biography
John Ryan was born on November 1, 1913, in Albany, New York, to Patrick and Agnes (Patterson) Ryan. He attended Christian Brothers Academy in Albany, Manhattan College in New York City and St. Joseph's Seminary in Yonkers, New York.

Ryan was ordained to the priesthood by Bishop Edmund Gibbons for the Diocese of Albany on June 3, 1939. During World War II, Ryan served in the US Navy Chaplain Corps from 1943 to 1946.  He participated in the 1945 Marine landing at Okinawa; he was cited twice for bravery.

After his discharge from the Navy, Ryan served in the Diocese of Albany from 1946 to 1957.  He was chancellor of the U.S. Military Vicariate from 1957 to 1958. From 1958 to 1960, he was based in Beirut, Lebannon, where he did relief work with the Catholic Near East Welfare Association and the Pontifical Mission for Palestine.

Archbishop of Anchorage
On February 7, 1966, Ryan was appointed the first archbishop of the Archdiocese of Anchorage by Pope Paul VI. He received his episcopal consecration on March 25, 1966. from Cardinal Francis Spellman, with Bishops Edward Joseph Maginn and Edward Ernest Swanstrom serving as co-consecrators. The archdiocese was erected following the 1964 Good Friday earthquake, and was formed from the South Central area of the Diocese of Juneau.

Coadjutor Archbishop for the Military Vicariate

Archbishop for the Military Services, USA
Ryan was named by Paul VI as coadjutor archbishop for the Military Vicariate and Titular Archbishop of Gabii on November 4, 1975.Ryan was appointed to assist Cardinal Terence Cooke, who was serving both as archbishop of the vicariate and archbishop of New York.  Cook died on October 6, 1983.

Pope John Paul II elevated the Military Vicariate to the Archdiocese of the Military Services, USA, on March 16, 1985, and named Ryan as its the first archbishop. As archbishop, Ryan provided for the pastoral and spiritual care of Catholics in the United States armed forces and their families, residents of veterans hospitals and civilian government employees living abroad.

John Paul II accepted Ryan's resignation as archbishop of the Military Services on May 14, 1991.  Ryan then returned to Albany for retirement.  John Ryan died on October 9, 2000, in Albany at age 86.

See also

 Catholic Church hierarchy
 Catholic Church in the United States
 Historical list of the Catholic bishops of the United States
 Insignia of Chaplain Schools in the US Military
 List of Catholic bishops of the United States
 List of Catholic bishops of the United States: military service
 Lists of patriarchs, archbishops, and bishops
 Military chaplain
 Religious symbolism in the United States military
 United States military chaplains
 United States Navy Chaplain Corps

References

External links
Official site of the Holy See

1913 births
2000 deaths
Roman Catholic archbishops of Anchorage
Roman Catholic archbishops for the United States Military Services
American Roman Catholic clergy of Irish descent
20th-century Roman Catholic archbishops in the United States
Manhattan College alumni
Religious leaders from Albany, New York
United States Navy chaplains
World War II chaplains